The 2010 United States Senate election in Oklahoma was held on November 2, 2010. Incumbent first-term Republican U.S. Senator Tom Coburn won re-election to a second term.

Democratic primary

Candidates 
 Jim Rogers, retired college professor
 Mark Myles, businessman

Results

Republican primary

Candidates 
 Tom Coburn, incumbent U.S. Senator
 Evelyn Rogers, librarian
 Lewis Kelly Spring, teacher

Results

General election

Candidates 
 Tom Coburn (R), incumbent U.S. Senator
 Ronald Dwyer (I), activist
 Jim Rogers (D), teacher
 Stephen Wallace (I), businessman

Campaign 
Coburn, a very popular incumbent, promised to self-term limit himself to two terms. Despite his popularity, he did release television advertisements. In 2009, Coburn's approval rating in a PPP poll was 59%, including a 39% approval rating among Democrats. His Democratic opponent is a perennial candidate who did little campaigning.

Predictions

Polling

Fundraising

Results

References 
General

Specific
 Official candidate list , Government of Oklahoma

External links 

 Oklahoma State Election Board
 U.S. Congress candidates for Oklahoma at Project Vote Smart
 Oklahoma U.S. Senate 2010 from OurCampaigns.com
 Campaign contributions from Open Secrets
 2010 Oklahoma Polls graph of multiple polls from Pollster.com
 Election 2010: Oklahoma Senate from Rasmussen Reports
 2010 Oklahoma Senate Coburn vs. Rogers from Real Clear Politics
 2010 Oklahoma Senate Race from CQ Politics
 Race profile from The New York Times
 News coverage from The Oklahoman
Official campaign websites (Archived)
 Tom Coburn for U.S. Senate
 Mark Myles for U.S. Senate

2010
Oklahoma
2010 Oklahoma elections